Gowen County is one of the 141 Cadastral divisions of New South Wales. It is located to the east of the Castlereagh River in the area to the east of Gilgandra, to Coonabarabran in the north-east. This includes land on both sides of the Newell Highway.

The origin of the name Gowen County is unknown.

Parishes within this county
A full list of parishes found within this county; their current LGA and mapping coordinates to the approximate centre of each location is as follows:

References

Counties of New South Wales